The Revolutionary Government of Zanzibar is a semi-autonomous government within Tanzania for Zanzibar, which consists of the northern part of the  Zanzibar Archipelago, mainly the islands of Unguja and Pemba.

Structure
The government is made up of a Revolutionary Council and a House of Representatives of Zanzibar. The head of the government is the President of Zanzibar, who is also the chairman of the Revolutionary Council, currently Dr. Hussein Mwinyi.

See also
 Federacy

External links
 Government of Zanzibar

References 

Government of Zanzibar